Ordinary Fascism, or Triumph Over Violence is a 1965 Soviet film directed by Mikhail Romm. The film is also known as Echo of the Jackboot in the United Kingdom. The film uses archival footage to depict the rise and fall of fascism in Nazi Germany.

Style
The film's style was largely influenced by the work of Soviet documentarian Esfir Shub. Shub is regarded as the creator of the compilation film, which re-uses preexisting footage to depict historical events. Shub's most famous compilation film, The Fall of the Romanov Dynasty, gathered newsreel footage from pre-revolutionary Russia to depict the decline of the Czar and valorize the Russian Revolution. Inspired by Shub's state-approved documentary style, Romm culled material from German archives, archives of post-war antifascist organizations, photo archives, and archives seized from the German military to create his documentary.

Romm employed several cutting-edge technologies in the documentary. Using the reverse playback technique, Romm was able to repeat sequences like the kiss given by a Nazi party official to industrialist Alfried Krupp, which Romm used to highlight the relationship between the Nazi party and organized capital. Romm also used freeze-frame shots to focus on specific moments from the archival footage.

Aside from co-writing, co-editing, and directing the film, Romm also provided the film's narration. Initially, had wanted the narration done by someone else, but when his collaborators heard working versions of his voice-over, they encouraged him to record it himself. Romm's unique vocabulary and intonation became one of the film's main identifying features.

According to one of the screenwriters, Maya Turovskaya, the film was made not only as a critical study of Nazism, but also as a critical study of every existing totalitarian regime, including the Soviet government, and because of that it became very popular in the Soviet Union.

Influence
Vadim Abdrashitov in an interview mentions Ordinary Fascism as the film that inspired him to make his own movies.

Soundtrack

References

External links 

Films directed by Mikhail Romm
1965 films
1960s Russian-language films
1965 documentary films
Soviet black-and-white films
Documentary films about World War II
Documentary films about the Holocaust
Documentary films about Nazi Germany
Black-and-white documentary films